Georgia's 13th congressional district is a congressional district in the U.S. state of Georgia. The district is currently represented by Democrat David Scott, though the district's boundaries have been redrawn following the 2010 census, which granted an additional congressional seat to Georgia.  The first election using the new district boundaries (listed below) were the 2012 congressional elections.

The district is located in the southern and western portions of the Atlanta metropolitan area and includes the cities of Austell, Jonesboro, Mableton, Douglasville, Stockbridge, and Union City, as well as the southern fourth of Atlanta itself.

Counties
 Clayton (Partial, see also )
 Cobb (Partial, see also  and )
 Douglas 
 Fayette (Partial, see also )
 Henry (Partial, see also  and )

Recent results in presidential elections

List of members representing the district

Election results

2002

2004

2006

2008

2010

2012

2014

2016

2018

2020

2022

References

External links
 PDF map of Georgia's 13th district at nationalatlas.gov
 Georgia's 13th congressional district at GovTrack.us

13
Constituencies established in 2003
2003 establishments in Georgia (U.S. state)